Sharon Fichman and Marie-Ève Pelletier were the defending champions, but Pelletier chose not to participate. Fichman partnered up with Valeria Solovieva, but lost in the semifinals to Elena Bovina and Julia Glushko.

Maria Sanchez and Yasmin Schnack won the title, defeating Bovina and Glushko in the final, 6–2, 6–2.

Seeds

Draw

Draw

References
 Main Draw

Boyd Tinsley Women's Clay Court Classic - Doubles